Ditherington Flax Mill (promoted as the Shrewsbury Flaxmill Maltings), a flax mill located in Ditherington, a suburb of Shrewsbury, England, is the first iron-framed building in the world, and described as "the grandfather of skyscrapers", despite its five-storey height.  Its importance was officially recognised in the 1950s, resulting in it becoming a Grade I listed building. It is also locally known as the "Maltings" from its later use. The mill is in the hands of Historic England and is currently in use as a mixed-use workspace and exhibition following its official opening in 2022.

History
The Flax Mill's architect was Charles Bage, who designed the mill using an iron-framed structure, inspired by the work of William Strutt. The columns and cross-beams were made by William Hazledine at his foundry in Shrewsbury. The construction of the mill ran from 1796 to 1797, at a cost (including equipment) of £17,000.

The mill was built for John Marshall of Leeds, Thomas Benyon, and Benjamin Benyon. The architect, Bage, was also a partner in the venture. This partnership was dissolved in 1804, the mill being retained by John Marshall, who paid off his partners on the basis that it was worth £64,000. Castlefields Mill was built by the other partners nearby. These two flax mills provided the 'chief manufacture' of Shrewsbury (according to an 1851 directory). The mill closed in 1886, and was sold, together with a bleach yard at Hanwood, for £3,000. The building was then converted to a maltings (hence its more commonly used local name), and as a consequence many windows were bricked up.

Its design effectively overcame much of the problem of fire damage from flammable atmosphere, due to the air containing many fibres, by using a fireproof combination of cast iron columns and cast iron beams, a system which later developed into the modern steel frame which made skyscrapers possible.

The maltings closed in 1987, suffering competition with modern production methods, with the complex left derelict until its purchase by English Heritage with support from the Shrewsbury and Atcham Borough Council and Advantage West Midlands in 2005. Plans to transform the site into offices and shops were given approval in October 2010. Following the split of English Heritage in 2015 responsibility for statutory functions and protection of the site was inherited by Historic England with the visitor attractions managed by local charity Friends of the Flaxmill Maltings.

Following delays to restoration amid the Great Recession, a new visitor centre, partly funded by the Heritage Lottery Fund and the European Regional Development Fund, opened in November 2015 in the former office and stables block. Phase Two of the restoration works started in June 2017, involving the Main Mill and the Kiln with an extra grant of £7.9 million on top of the previous £12.1 million from the Heritage Lottery Fund for conversion into a mixed-use venue. This phase involved the restoration of the larger windows from the flax mill era to improve natural lighting, although the existing smaller windows from the maltings era have been retained but with the frames replaced.

The Main Mill was officially opened on 10 September 2022 as mixed-use workspace and public exhibition with a café and shop. It is hoped that the four remaining listed buildings (the Apprentice House, the Cross Mill, the Dye House and the Warehouse) will be restored in the coming years. In late September 2022, Friends of the Flaxmill Maltings announced their winding down as a charity and a company with the preference of Historic England for a company set up by themselves to take over operations.

Buildings in the group
Along with the main Flax Mill, a number of other buildings in the group are listed for their architectural and historic value: the apprentice house (Grade II*); the dye house (Grade II*); the flax dressing building or Cross Mill (Grade I); the flax warehouse (Grade I); the stables (Grade II); the malting kiln (Grade II) and the workshops and offices (Grade II). The mill and buildings are on the Heritage at Risk Register.

Gallery

See also
Listed buildings in Shrewsbury (outer areas)

References

Sources
 https://www.bbc.co.uk/news/uk-england-shropshire-23495105

External links
Official website
Friends of the Flaxmill Maltings website
 

Textile mills in England
Buildings and structures in Shrewsbury
Former textile mills in the United Kingdom
History of Shropshire
Linen industry
Industrial buildings completed in 1797
Textile mills completed in the 18th century
Grade I listed buildings in Shropshire
Grade II listed buildings in Shropshire
Grade II* listed buildings in Shropshire
Grade I listed industrial buildings
Grade II listed industrial buildings
Grade II* listed industrial buildings